The cinema of North Korea began with the division of Korea and has been sustained since then by the ruling Kim dynasty. Kim Il-sung and his successor Kim Jong-il were both cinephiles and sought to produce propaganda films based on the Juche ideology.

All film production is supervised by the Workers' Party of Korea and generally concerns propaganda. North Korea has nevertheless produced some non-propaganda films for export to the wider world.

Film studios
North Korea's principal producer of feature films is the Korean Film Studio, a state-run studio founded in 1947 and located outside of Pyongyang. Other North Korean film studios include the Korean Documentary Film Studio (founded in 1946), the April 25 Film Studio of the Korean People's Army (founded in 1959 and previously known as the February 8 Cinema Studio) and the Korean Science and Educational Film Studio (founded in 1953 and also known as the April 26 Children's Film Production House, and Science Educational Korea, or SEK.) These studios produce feature films, documentaries, animated films, children's films and science films. According to a report from 1992, the Korean Feature Film Studio produced about forty films per year, while the other studios together accounted for another forty.

In addition to its domestic animated productions, SEK has produced animation for foreign companies. Production costs in North Korea are very low, and the quality of animators is well perceived. SEK has done work on such productions as Mondo TV's animated series Pocahontas and King Lion Simba and the films Light Years and Empress Chung.

North Korean leader Kim Il-sung believed in Lenin's maxim: "Cinema is the most important of all arts." Accordingly, since the country's division, North Korean films have often been used as vehicles for instilling government ideology into the people. A common theme is martyrdom/sacrifice for the nation. The film Fate of a Self-defence Corps Member, based on a novel written by Kim Il-sung during the fight against the Japanese occupation reflects this theme, as does the highly regarded film, Sea of Blood (1969). The latter film comes from a novel telling the story of a woman farmer who becomes a national heroine by fighting the Japanese.

Another favorite theme is the happiness of the current society. This theme can be seen reflected in titles of feature films like A Family of Workers, A Flowering Village, Rolling Mill Workers, When Apples Are Picked and Girls at a Port. All of these films were awarded the People's Prize before 1974.

Production estimates
The number of films produced in North Korea is difficult to determine. In 1992, Asiaweek reported that the country produced about 80 films annually, and a BBC report in 2001 indicated that North Korea was then producing about 60 films a year. In spite of these claims, Johannes Schönherr, an attendee of the 2000 Pyongyang International Film Festival, found little evidence for actual films or titles. He notes that the country offered only one domestic feature and one documentary at their most high-profile film festival, and suggests that the high number of reported films includes short films, cartoons, and short installments of long-running series. He also cites a 1998 North Korean pamphlet containing a list of films which had been made in the country up to 1998. This gives a total of 259 titles, and indicates that the 1980s were the most prolific decade with about 15 to 20 films made yearly.

The British Film Institute Sight & Sound magazine reported that an average of 20 films per year were made from the 1960s to the early 1990s. However, in the economic hard times following the collapse of the Soviet Union film production reduced, and from 2000 to 2009 only about 5 films per year were made.

Film festivals
The Pyongyang International Film Festival, established in 1987 and broadened in scope in 2002, is now held every two years.

History

1940s and 1950s
After the division of Korea following the defeat of the Japanese Empire in WWII, filmmakers in the North and the South sought to produce the first Korean film after the liberation in their respective half of the peninsula. Although South Koreans were first, with Viva Freedom! (1946), North Korea soon followed with My Home Village.

Because of the secretive nature of the country as well as the lack of film exports, the exact number of feature films produced in North Korea is almost impossible to determine. The Internet Movie Database (IMDb) lists only 165 films produced in North Korea; some of which include foreign co-productions. Two of these were released in the years between the liberation from Japan and the outbreak of the Korean War, Our Construction (Uri Geonseol) (1946) and My Homeland (1949). Five were released during the war, including Righteous War (1950), Boy Partisans (1951) and Again to the Front (1952). These titles suggest that film was used for ideological purposes from the beginning of North Korea's existence as a separate entity.

Nearly all studios and film archives were destroyed during the Korean War, and after 1953 studios had to be rebuilt.

1960s and 1970s
A Spinner (1964) and Boidchi annun dchonson (1965) were made in the 1960s. One of the most highly regarded films in North Korea, Sea of Blood, was produced in 1969. The entrance hall to the Korean Feature Film Studio contains a mural of "Dear Leader" Kim Jong-il supervising the production of this film. This is a two-part, black and white film. The first part is 125 minutes in duration, and the second is 126 minutes.

Kim Il-sung made a famous call for Juche art in 1966, saying, "Our art should develop in a revolutionary way, reflecting the Socialist content with the national form". In a 1973 treatise on film entitled On the Art of the Cinema, Kim Jong-il further developed this idea of Juche art into the cinema, claiming that it is cinema's duty to help develop the people into "true communists", and as a means "to completely eradicate capitalist elements". The ideology-heavy nature of North Korean cinema during the 1970s can be seen in titles such as The People Sing of the Fatherly Leader and The Rays of Juche Spread All Over the World.

Part of this ideological usage of the arts was a treating of the same subjects repeatedly through various art forms. Consequently, the most prominent films of the era took their stories and titles from pre-existing novels, ballets or operas. The film Sea of Blood was also an opera and a symphony, as well as the name of an opera company. Future Minister of Culture, Choe Ik-kyu's The Flower Girl (1972, 130 min.) later was remade as a dance. This film won a special prize and special medal at the 18th International Film Festival, and is one of the more well-known North Korean films of the 1970s.

Unsung Heroes, a 20-part spy film about the Korean War, was released between 1978 and 1981; it achieved notice outside of North Korea two decades later mainly because United States Forces Korea defector Charles Robert Jenkins played a role as a villain and the husband of one of the main characters.

1980s and 1990s
With 14 listings, the 1980s is the best-represented decade for North Korea at IMDB. A possible turning to less didactic subjects is indicated with a 1986 production of the popular stories like Chunhyang-jon (1980 - 155 min.) and Hong kil dong (1986 - 115 min.). Probably the most well-known North Korean film internationally is the giant-monster epic, Pulgasari (1985), directed by a kidnapped South Korean director Shin Sang-ok. Multi-part films promoting the Juche ideology, including Star of Korea and The Sun of the Nation were also produced in the 1980s. North Korean animation produced for domestic consumption is reportedly less politically dogmatic during this period, resulting in a large adult audience. At least one international co-production has been filmed in North Korea, Ten Zan - Ultimate Mission, directed by Italian director Ferdinando Baldi and starring American Frank Zagarino. Norodom Sihanouk, a filmmaker and former King of Cambodia, was among Kim Il-sung's good friends, allowing him to make up to four films in North Korea beginning with The Mysterious City in 1988, using the country's actors and facilities while in exile away from Cambodia.

IMDB lists only four North Korean films made in the 1990s. Nation and Destiny is a 62-part series of movies produced from 1992–2002, on Korean subjects and people like General Choi Duk Shin (parts 1-4) and composer Yun I-sang (parts 5-8).

2000 and Present 
The 2000s appear to be reasonably productive for North Korean cinema, having five listings so far. In a sign of thawing relations, the animated film, Empress Chung (2005), is a co-production of South and North Korea. This film is said to be the first released simultaneously in both countries. Another recent North/South co-production is the 3-D animated television series Lazy Cat Dinga.

See also

Abduction of Shin Sang-ok and Choi Eun-hee
List of North Korean films
List of North Korean television series
On the Art of the Cinema

References

Further reading

External links

Korea Film Corporation 
 
Mock-up Location Streets picture album at Naenara